Mette Frederiksen (born 19 November 1977) is a Danish politician who has served as Prime Minister of Denmark since June 2019, and Leader of the Social Democrats since June 2015. The second woman to hold either office, she is also the youngest prime minister in Danish history.

Besides a brief career as a trade unionist (2000–2001), Frederiksen has never had any employment outside politics. She was first elected to the Folketing in the 2001 general election, representing Copenhagen County. After the Social Democrats won the 2011 general election, she was appointed Minister of Employment by Prime Minister Helle Thorning-Schmidt. She was promoted to Minister of Justice in 2014. After the Social Democrats' narrow defeat in the 2015 general election, Thorning-Schmidt stood down, and Frederiksen won the subsequent leadership election to replace her, becoming Leader of the Opposition. Frederiksen led her party into the 2019 general election, which resulted in the bloc of left-wing and centre-left parties (her Social Democrats, the Social Liberals, the Socialist People's Party, the Red–Green Alliance, the Faroese Social Democratic Party, and Greenland's Siumut and Inuit Ataqatigiit) winning a majority in the Folketing. Frederiksen was subsequently commissioned by Queen Margrethe II to lead negotiations to form a new government, and was sworn in as prime minister on 27 June. In December 2021, she became the longest-serving incumbent female head of government in the European Union.

In July 2022, the Mink Commission released a report that criticized Frederiksen's government's handling of the Cluster 5 COVID-19 outbreak among Danish mink, though it absolved Frederiksen of deliberate misleading of the public. The Danish Social Liberal Party brought an ultimatum against Frederiksen threatening to bring a motion of no confidence against her government if she did not call for an early election. On 5 October 2022, Frederiksen announced that an election was to be held on 1 November of the same year. The election resulted in the best result for the Social Democrats in 20 years with the party gaining two more seats for a total of 50. Frederiksen herself received 60,837 votes, the most of any candidate. On 13 December 2022, Frederiksen announced that an accord on a coalition government with the Social Democrats, the Venstre, Denmarks liberal party and the Moderates had been reached, with herself continuing as prime minister.

Early life
She was born 19 November 1977 in the city of Aalborg in North Denmark. Frederiksen's father was a typographer and her mother was a teacher. As a teenager, she campaigned to preserve rain forests, protect whales and end apartheid.

Frederiksen attended the Aalborghus Gymnasium. She holds a bachelor's degree in Administration and Social Science from Aalborg University, and a master's degree in African Studies from the University of Copenhagen.

Political career

Member of Folketing 

Frederiksen worked as a youth consultant for LO, The Danish Confederation of Trade Unions. She was elected as a member of parliament for Copenhagen County in the 2001 general election which saw the Social Democrats losing the first place and placing second for the first time since 1920. After her election, Frederiksen was named as her party's spokesperson for culture, media and gender equality. In 2002, she received the Nina Bang award for showing political courage, enthusiasm and impact with social feeling. In addition, she received the Ting Prize in 2012 and has co-authored the books Epostler (2003) and From Fight to Culture (2004). After the 2005 general election loss, Frederiksen became her party's spokesperson for social affairs. Following the election, she also served as the vice-chairperson of the parliamentary group of the Social Democrats. In the 2007 general election which saw the Social Democrats losing two more seats, Frederiksen obtained 27,077 votes, placing her in seventh place in the ranking of the ten Danish politicians with the most votes.

After the 2011 general election which led to a Social Democrats government, Frederiksen served under Prime Minister Helle Thorning-Schmidt as Minister for Employment from 2011 to 2014 and Minister of Justice from 2014 until she succeeded her as party leader. As Minister of Employment, she headed for reforms of early retirement pensions, flex jobs and the employment system. Likewise, the controversial cash assistance reform meant lower cash benefits for young unemployed and provided cohabiting mutual support, among other things.

Leader of the Social Democrats 
Under Frederiksen's leadership starting after the 2015 general election in which the Social Democrats returned to first place and gained three seats in the Folketing, the party has moved back to the left on economic issues while taking a conservative stance on immigration.

Prime Minister of Denmark

2019 election 
The 2019 general election saw the Social Democrats gaining a further seat while support for the Danish People's Party and the Liberal Alliance collapsed, costing Lars Løkke Rasmussen his majority. With the result beyond doubt on election night, Rasmussen conceded defeat. Frederiksen was appointed Prime Minister on 27 June 2019, heading an exclusively Social Democratic minority government supported by the red bloc of the Social Liberal Party, the Red-Green Alliance and the Green Left. Despite having run on an anti-immigration stance during the election, Frederiksen briefly shifted her stance on immigration by allowing more foreign labour and reversing government plans to hold foreign criminals offshore after winning government.

Foreign policy 

Frederiksen gained international attention in August 2019 when U.S. President Donald Trump cancelled a state visit to Denmark following her refusal to sell Greenland, an autonomous territory of the Kingdom of Denmark. On 15 August, The Wall Street Journal reported that Trump had discussed the possibility of buying Greenland with aides. Kim Kielsen, the Premier of Greenland, responded by saying that Greenland is not for sale. On 18 August, after the rumor was confirmed by the White House, Frederiksen echoed Kielsen's comments, saying that "Greenland is not Danish. Greenland belongs to Greenland", and called the discussion "absurd". On 20 August, Trump cancelled the state visit, scheduled 2–3 September, with specific reference to Frederiksen's refusal to discuss a possible sale.

On 3 January 2020, Iranian General Qasem Soleimani was assassinated by the United States, which considerably heightened the existing tensions between the two countries. Frederiksen called it "a really serious situation". She avoided the question on whether the killing was right, instead calling for de-escalation.

At the request of the United States, Frederiksen initiated diplomatic talks in early 2022 on the possible presence of American troops on Danish soil. Frederiksen expressed enthusiasm for the talks, stating that "We want a stronger American presence in Europe and in Denmark".

2022 Russian invasion of Ukraine 
Following the 2022 Russian invasion of Ukraine, Frederiksen's government initiated political talks with the five main political parties of the Folketing (Social Liberal Party, Socialist People's Party, Venstre, and Conservative People's Party), and presented the "National Compromise on Danish Security Policy" on 4 March 2022, in which a significant increase in Danish defence spending, an emergency allocation of DKK 7 billion for the Danish defence, a plan for independence from Russian gas, and a referendum on the Danish EU defence opt-out were presented. The country will gradually increase defense spending to 2% of GDP by 2033 (as agreed within NATO), which corresponds to an increase in annual defense spending of around 18 billion DKK ($2.65 billion).

On 21 April, together with Spanish Prime Minister Pedro Sánchez, she visited Ukraine's capital Kyiv and President Volodymyr Zelenskyy. At the meeting, Frederiksen promised an increase in arms and military aid to Ukraine by 600 million DKK, bringing the total Danish aid to 1 billion DKK. Denmark has previously sent 2,700 M72 LAW light anti-tank weapons to the Ukrainian army.

European Union 
In 2020, Frederiksen was labeled "Denmark's most eurosceptic PM in a long time" by the Danish online newspaper Altinget, as she has often criticised the EU's response to the COVID-19 pandemic, and their vaccine program.

During the 2022 referendum on the EU defense opt-out, Frederiksen campaigned against maintaining the opt-out. Following the abolition of said opt-out, Frederiksen stated that she had no intentions of seeking the abolition of the remaining opt-outs. She had previously, as justice minister, supported the abolition of the judicial opt-out in the 2015 referendum.

2022 Nord Stream gas leaks 
Frederiksen said the 2022 Nord Stream gas leaks were sabotage, while cautioning that it was not an attack on Denmark as they occurred in international waters. Frederiksen travelled to London and Brussels to discuss the leaks with British Prime Minister Liz Truss, President of the European Council Charles Michel and NATO Secretary General Jens Stoltenberg. She also talked with French President Emmanuel Macron over the phone. She reiterated to all she spoke with that there is a need for increased surveillance of critical infrastructure and that they must take Russian President Vladimir Putin's threats seriously.

COVID-19 pandemic
Frederiksen has been leading the Danish Government response to the COVID-19 pandemic in Denmark. In 2020, she issued an order to mink farmers to cull millions of these animals in the wake of the COVID-19 pandemic; this decision later turned out to be unconstitutional. By 2021, she joined forces with Chancellor Sebastian Kurz of Austria and Prime Minister Benjamin Netanyahu of Israel in setting up a joint research and development fund, and possibly production facilities for COVID-19 vaccines, to ensure they had long-term supplies for booster shots or to contend with virus mutations.

Education reform 
In June 2021, Frederiksen's government announced a new model of distributing gymnasium applicants. The model aims to solve the issue of ethnic and economic disparity and "parallel society tendencies" between gymnasiums by considering parent income. Heavy criticism was directed at the suggestion by the blue bloc, who called it "forced distribution". A petition for scrapping the law gained over 50000 signatures, allowing it to be presented before the Folketing.

A year later, in June 2022, Frederiksen and her government announced their intention to introduce a ceiling to the entry quotient of higher education. Education offers with a higher entry quotient than the proposed ceiling, 10, would have to offer admission through other means, such as a subject-specific admission test. The goal of the ceiling is to lessen the pressure on students by reducing the need for high grades, and to allow students greater freedom in selecting education.

In September 2022, Frederiksen proposed that approximately half of all Master's degrees would be shortened from two years to one year. This would mostly affect degrees in the social sciences and humanities, with natural sciences and medicine being left mostly untouched. The proposal was met with harsh criticism from students, academics, rectors and parts of the business world, claiming it would negatively affect the quality of education and require the learning of two years material in one year. Frederiksen denied this, claiming the quality of education was to increase and that workers could be trained on the job.

Political positions

Social policies 
Frederiksen has stated a desire to be "Prime Minister of Children", and in 2021, she presented a plan, called, "Law of Children", in order to put the children at front in social cases, including giving municipalities more resources to take children away from violent parents, and to give children more rights in divorce cases. In 2020, she also made a deal with the Socialist People's Party, the Red-Green Alliance, and the Danish People's Party, in order to give people who have worked for long the ability to get early retirement. This was also one of Frederiksen's main promises during the 2019 election campaign.

Frederiksen is a vocal opponent of prostitution because she considers it violence against women. For many years, she has strongly advocated for the prohibition of the purchase of sex, as in Sweden, Norway, and Iceland. In 2002, she opened the debate on the abolition of prostitution, and was behind the 2009 congressional decision that the Social Democrats would "work for a ban on the purchase of sexual acts", saying that prostitution caused mental health damage to the prostitute.

Immigration 
Frederiksen became increasingly sceptical of liberal mass immigration, as she believes it has had negative impacts for much of the population, a more pressing issue since at least 2001 after the 11 September attacks which intensified during the 2015 European migrant crisis. In a recent biography, Frederiksen stated: "For me, it is becoming increasingly clear that the price of unregulated globalization, mass immigration, and the free movement of labour is paid for by the lower classes."

Under Frederiksen, the Social Democrats voted in favour of a law allowing Danish authorities to confiscate money, jewellery, and other valuable items from refugees crossing the border. The bill received harsh condemnation from the United Nations Human Rights Council, and widespread comparisons between the plan and the treatment of Jews in Nazi-occupied Europe. The Social Democrats voted for a law banning the wearing of burqas and niqabs, while abstaining during a vote on a law on mandatory handshakes, irrespective of religious sentiment, at citizenship ceremonies and on a plan to house criminal asylum seekers on a bridgeless island on which they would have to stay at night. Frederiksen also backed the right-wing populist Danish People's Party in their paradigm shift push to make repatriation, rather than integration, the goal of asylum policy. She has called for a cap on non-Western immigrants, expulsion of asylum seekers to a reception centre in North Africa, and forced 37-hours-per-week labour for immigrants in exchange for benefits.

Frederiksen has referred to Islam as a "barrier to integration", arguing that some Muslims "do not respect the Danish judicial system", that some Muslim women refuse to work for religious reasons, and that Muslim girls are subject to "massive social control", and has called for Muslim schools to be closed.

In April 2021, Frederiksen announced that Denmark's "ultimate goal" shall henceforth be one of "zero spontaneous asylum seekers". Danish Integration Minister Mattias Tesfaye added that "no exceptions will be made" towards that goal. Danish Refugee Council's Secretary General Charlotte Slente called the move "irresponsible". The Danish state subsequently ceased the renewal of temporary residency permits to about 189 Syrian refugees, claiming that it is "now safe to return to Syria".

Despite having adopted new stricter migration policies than earlier Social Democratic governments, she and her government has also introduced a few relaxations of Danish immigration policies. Even though Mette Frederiksen and her government are against the idea of spontaneous asylum seekers, they are supporters of the UN refugee quota system and has reintroduced Denmark's participation in that system. Other relaxations include getting the children out of the infamous migration center Sjælsmark and increasing social benefits for refugees.

Globalisation 
She has argued that perception of the Social Democrats adopting the Third Way and practicing centrist, neoliberal economics and supporting unrestricted globalisation contributed to the party's poor electoral performance in the early 21st century. Labeling economic foreign policies of Europe as too liberal, Frederiksen has criticised other social democratic parties for losing their voters' trust by failing to prevent globalisation chipping away at labour rights, increasing inequality and exposing them to uncontrolled immigration.

Climate change 
Frederiksen's government made international news with the agreement to reduce Denmark's territorial emissions by 70% in 2030 compared to 1990, the decision to stop oil and gas exploration after 2050 (also driven by the fact that only one company applied for a lease in the latest auction), and the energy islands in the North Sea.

Frederiksen publicly said: "I was a social democrat before I got green. And when I wake up in the morning, I am still a social democrat before I am green."

More than a year after having set an ambitious reduction target for the decade, there are in March 2021 no concrete plans for dealing with the remaining two-thirds of the needed reductions to achieve the Danish 2030 emission target. Green NGOs have largely viewed Frederiksen's Minister of Climate Dan Jørgensen's tenure negatively in 2020.

Frederiksen's government has described its climate action strategy as a "hockey stick" model. This means it plans to await new technologies and falling costs and thus only achieve most reductions at the end of the decade. This strategy has been described by other political parties as a "Bjørn Lomborg" dream.

Despite pleas from the UNFCCC, the International Monetary Fund, the World Bank, the Danish Economic Councils and the Danish Council on Climate Change, Frederiksen's government has postponed the implementation of a higher carbon pricing mechanism, even though Denmark was a pioneer with its adoption in 1992. The opposition to higher carbon taxes was positively received by associations representing the major emitting sectors such as the Confederation of Danish Industry and Danish Agriculture and Food Council.

As of March 2021, Denmark stands to have a much lower price on carbon than its neighbours in 2030, with consequences such as trucks from Germany waiting to refuel until they are in Denmark to benefit from the low diesel prices in Denmark. Denmark is also one of the four EU countries without carbon taxes on passenger flights. In fact, Frederiksen's government had plans to guarantee domestic flights during the COVID-19 crisis by subsidising domestic flights, a decision decried by green NGOs and the supporting parties Red-Green Alliance and the Socialist People's Party. The decision was not implemented as the European Commission would not approve it due to regulations on state aid.

Frederiksen's government entered a formal agreement with the cement manufacturer Aalborg Portland (Denmark's largest carbon emitter standing for 4% of the national emissions) concluding that they did not have to reduce their annual emissions below their 1990 level of 1.54 million  tons. Previously, Mette Frederiksen had said: "I will chain myself to Portland before anyone is allowed to close them".

Similarly, her government has been criticised for allowing state-owned companies to continue the build-out of fossil fuel infrastructure like a natural gas pipeline of 115 km, with an associated socio-economic cost of $113 million for Denmark. In a formal answer to the Parliament, the Minister of Climate Dan Jørgensen confirmed that the gas pipeline would not reduce the carbon emissions in the short term nor add any jobs in Denmark.

As stipulated in the Climate Act, the Danish Council on Climate Change has to make annual recommendations for and provide a status update on the Danish government's climate efforts. In February 2021, the Danish Council on Climate Council found it was not likely that Frederiksen's government would achieve their original target of a 70% reduction of greenhouse gases by 2030.

Controversies and criticism

Private school case 
In May 2010, it was revealed that Frederiksen's daughter, along with the children of several other prominent Social Democrat politicians, was being educated at a private school. Along with her colleagues, Frederiksen was accused of hypocrisy by the Danish press as her party had long seen the promotion of public education as a key policy. In 2005, Frederiksen had openly criticised parents who sent their children to private schools. Frederiksen responded to the criticism by saying that her opinion on private education had become more nuanced since her remarks in 2005 and that it would have been hypocritical of her to put her own political career ahead of her daughter's best interest.

The unemployment benefit case 
On 14 March 2013, Ekstra Bladet announced that she and her ministry had failed to inform the Folketing about the correct figures regarding how many unemployment benefit recipients would drop out of the unemployment benefit system in 2013. According to Ekstra Bladet, on 5 December 2012, the Ministry of Employment had new figures for how many people were expected to lose the right to unemployment benefits on 1 January 2013 and the following six months. The number was 22,679 people and thus significantly higher than the 7–12,000 people that the government had announced. She was strongly criticized for this - and both the Unity List and the Danish People's Party subsequently called her in consultation on the matter.

The new unemployment benefit rules were adopted in 2010 by the VK government and the Danish People's Party, and were to be fully implemented on 2 July 2012. The changes mean that the unemployment benefit period is shortened from 4 to 2 years. In the Finance Act agreement for 2012, it was agreed to extend the unemployment benefit period by up to half a year for all insured unemployed who exhausted the unemployment benefit entitlement in the second half of 2012. Therefore, it was not until 1 January 2013 that many began to lose their unemployment benefit entitlement.

Immigration policies 
Her government endured criticism in 2020 and 2021 for refusing to repatriate children with Danish citizenship from Syrian refugee camps in Kurdish-controlled Syria, due to their parents having joined the Islamic State. A medical report released in April 2022 revealed that many of the children were undernourished and that one 4-year-old in particular needed hospitalization. This led to her government preparing to evacuate the children on the condition that their parents do not come with, which again led to criticism, notably from her supporting parties, the Social Liberal Party and the Green Left.

2020 Danish mink cull 

At a press conference on 4 November 2020, Mette Frederiksen stated that the government had decided that all mink in Denmark should be killed due to the risk of infection with COVID-19. Subsequently, it emerged that this order was illegal and by many is described as in violation of the Constitution. The government came up with changing explanations and several parties in the Folketing demanded an account of the mink case. The statement was published on 18 November 2020 and it emerged that 6 ministers had been warned on 1 October 2020 that the order was illegal. Minister of Food, Agriculture and Fisheries Mogens Jensen withdrew immediately. Mette Frederiksen has denied knowledge of the lack of legal basis.

A commission of inquiry was set up to investigate the case, delivering its report on 30 June 2022. The report stated that Frederiksen's statements at the press conference on 4 November 2020 were "objectively grossly misleading", but that she wasn't aware of the illegality of the order to kill all mink. The Red-Green Alliance and Green Left, both of which are supporting parties of Frederiksen, announced they would not be voting for independent lawyer examination of the report, which could lead to impeachment. Leader of the Social Liberal Party, also a supporting party, Sofie Carsten Nielsen similarly did not want independent examination, but demanded a general election before 4 October 2022. If her demands aren't met, she promised to support a motion of no confidence against Frederiksen. Frederiksen later announced on 5 October 2022 that a general election would be held on 1 November 2022.

Frederiksen received an official reprimand from the Folketing on 5 July 2022 for her actions in handling the mink case. The reprimand stated that Frederiksen had "acted highly criticisable". This was given to her by her own government, with her own party, Social Democrats, not stating that she had committed any errors; the opposition did not participate as they considered it inadequate.

Personal life
Frederiksen has two children from her first marriage.

On 15 July 2020, Frederiksen married her longtime boyfriend Bo Tengberg, a film director. They were married at the Magleby Church, an affiliate of the Church of Denmark on the island of Møn.

Notes

References

External links 

 
 

1977 births
Living people
Politicians from Aalborg
Aalborg University alumni
Anti-prostitution activists
Danish Justice Ministers
Danish Lutherans
Danish trade unionists
Danish women activists
Female justice ministers
Employment ministers of Denmark
Leaders of the Social Democrats (Denmark)
Prime Ministers of Denmark
Social Democrats (Denmark) politicians
Women government ministers of Denmark
Women members of the Folketing
Women prime ministers
Danish women trade unionists
21st-century Danish women politicians
Members of the Folketing 2001–2005
Members of the Folketing 2005–2007
Members of the Folketing 2007–2011
Members of the Folketing 2011–2015
Members of the Folketing 2015–2019
Members of the Folketing 2019–2022
Women opposition leaders
Members of the Folketing 2022–2026